Te Maputeoa (baptized Gregorio Stanislas; reigned as Gregorio I; born c. 1814 – 20 June 1857) was a monarch of the Polynesian island of Mangareva and the other Gambier Islands. He was the King or ʻAkariki (paramount chief), as well as the penultimate king of the island of Mangareva, and other Gambier Islands including Akamaru, Aukena, Taravai and Temoe.  He reigned from 1830 until his death in 1857.

During Maputeoa's reign, the country, which was deeply rooted in native beliefs and even cannibalism, became a Roman Catholic community. This was accomplished by removing all vestiges of native beliefs, such as destroying the traditional wooden images of their indigenous faith deified in maraes and replacing them with churches. The king was baptized into Catholicism on 25 August 1836. He learned about Christianity from the island's missionaries, headed by the French Picpus priests, Honoré Laval and François Caret. His uncle Matua, the High Priest of the local temple, also played a pivotal role in this activity.

Biography
Maputeoa was the grandson of Mapurure (also known as Te Mateoa), who was known to be alive in 1825 and said to have died in 1830 or 1832. As Mapurure's son Te Ikatohara was killed by sharks in about 1824, Maputeoa, the grandson, became king after Mapurure's death. Because he was a minor, Maputeoa's uncle, Matua, the High Priest (taura tupua), became the regent; Matua enjoyed the full trust of his people and may have had intentions of usurping power. Maputeoa had complete authority over the kingdom, excepting his four uncles, who jointly owned the land with the king; the uncles' allegiance to the king was only formal. Mangareva also had nominal control over the other Gambier Islands including Akamaru, Aukena, and Taravai, which had their own kings who were vassals to the monarch at Rikitea.

Christian missionaries headed by Father Honoré Laval and Father François Caret from Chile of the order of the Congregation of the Sacred Hearts of Jesus and Mary, landed in August 1834, at Mangareva, which was then an independent kingdom under King Maputeoa. The king refused them access to the main island of Mangareva. However, the missionaries managed to land on a small island where the local chief gave them support to learn the Mangareva language and the islanders learned about Christianity. Within one of year of their arrival, the missionaries converted the islanders at Taravai, Aukena and Akamuru to Christianity, established churches, and even convinced the islanders to wear tunics.

Initially, Matua accepted the Catholic religious practices. He donated the maraes to the missionaries to build churches and advised them on how to overthrow the king. As Maputeoa recognized what Matua was trying to do, the king began appearing in churches during mass. Two years after the missionaries' arrival in Gambier, Maputeoa consented to dismantle the Te Keika marae, which was the largest of its kind on Rikitea, and in its place, St. Michael's Cathedral, Rikitea was built, which became the largest church in the South Pacific islands. Maputeoa was baptized at Church of Saint-Joseph-de-Taku on Mangareva along with 160 other people of the kingdom. He took the name  Gregorio after baptism in honor of Pope Gregory XVI who had deputed the missionaries to eastern Oceania, and solemnly placed his islands under the protection of the Blessed Virgin Mary.

Maputeoa died on 20 June 1857 of acute pleurisy or "the disease of the chest." He was succeeded as King of Mangareva by his young son, Joseph Gregorio II, with his widow Queen Maria Eutokia Toaputeitou as regent. King Joseph died childless after an eleven-year reign. After 1868, the island kingdom was ruled by regents until it was annexed by France in 1881. In 1977, French Polynesia issued a stamp with an image of Maputeoa. Maputeoa's crypt is located in the Chapelle St-Pierre behind St. Michael's Cathedral.

References

Bibliography

History of French Polynesia
Gambier Islands
1814 births
1857 deaths
Roman Catholic monarchs
French Polynesian royalty
People from the Gambier Islands
Deaths from respiratory disease
Converts to Roman Catholicism
French Polynesian Roman Catholics
19th-century monarchs in Oceania